The Racers is a 1955 film directed by Henry Hathaway and starring Kirk Douglas and Bella Darvi. The film is based on the book by Hans Ruesch entitled The Racer, based on the life of Rudolf Caracciola.

Plot
Race-car driver Gino Borgesa meets a ballerina, Nicole Laurent, whose pet poodle causes a crash at the track. She persuades an ex-lover to give Gino money for a new car. They begin a romance, although Gino warns her that his racing comes first.

After winning a 1,000-mile race, Gino is hired by a successful racing team managed by Maglio, who is leery of Gino's reckless driving tactics but takes a chance on him at the urging of veteran driver Carlos Chavez.

Nicole is troubled by Gino's unconcerned attitude about a mechanic accidentally killed at the track. A crash at a race in Brussels seriously injures Gino, whose leg is not amputated only because Nicole persuades doctors not to perform the operation.

Once he recovers, Gino begins taking painkillers as well as unnecessary risks. His behavior, too, is out of control, causing him to insult Michel Caron, a young French driver who admires him. Nicole is offended, and the last straw comes when Gino relentlessly wins the final race of Carlos's career, even after Maglio instructed him to let Carlos have one last victory.

In time, Gino's stature in racing begins to fall, and he is alone. He begs Nicole to return, but she is involved with Michel now. A contrite Gino returns to the track, where he willingly lets Michel  speed past him.

Cast
Kirk Douglas as Gino Borgesa
Bella Darvi as Nicole
Gilbert Roland as Dell'Orro
Cesar Romero as Carlos Chavez
Lee J. Cobb as Maglio
Katy Jurado as Maria Chavez

See also
List of American films of 1955

References

External links

1955 films
1955 drama films
20th Century Fox films
CinemaScope films
American drama films
American auto racing films
1950s English-language films
Films scored by Alex North
Films directed by Henry Hathaway
1950s American films